Ctenosaura palearis, commonly known as the Motagua spiny-tailed iguana, is a species of spiny-tailed iguana endemic to the Motagua Valley in Guatemala.

Conservation status
This species is threatened by habitat loss and illegal trade.  These iguanas were used as a source of food by natives. Its eggs are a food source for the equally threatened Motagua Valley beaded lizard (Heloderma charlesbogerti), thereby possibly linking the status of the two species. It is included in CITES appendix II so that trade of this species is regulated.

Diet
The Guatemalan spiny-tailed iguana feeds on leaves and the fruits of the cactus Stenocereus pruinosus and occasionally insects (crickets, beetles, ants and wasps).

Habitat
The habitat of C. palearis is characterized by a greater frequency of the cactus Stenocereus pruinosus, Albizzia idiopoda, Ximena americana  and Acacia deamii.  The Guatemalan spiny-tailed iguana can be regarded as a keystone species because it plays an important role in seed dispersal of S. pruinosus.

References

 Coti, P. and D. Ariano. 2008. Ecology and traditional use of the Guatemalan black iguana (Ctenosaura palearis) in the dry forests of the Motagua Valley, Guatemala. Iguana 15 (3): 142–149.

Further reading
 Stejneger, L. 1899. Description of a new species of spiny-tailed iguana from Guatemala. Proc. U.S. Natl. Mus. 21: 381–383.

Ctenosaura
Endemic fauna of Guatemala
Reptiles of Guatemala
Lizards of Central America
Taxa named by Leonhard Stejneger
Reptiles described in 1899
Taxonomy articles created by Polbot